Mohammad Asaduzzaman ( – 28 March 2008) was a Bangladeshi educator. He was a professor in the Public Administration Department of Dhaka University and Chairman of the University Grants Commission of Bangladesh (UGC). He was awarded the Ekushey Padak in 2006.

Asaduzzaman died of cardiac arrest at Birdem Hospital in Dhaka on 28 March 2008.

References

1940s births
2008 deaths
University of Dhaka alumni
Burials at Mirpur Martyred Intellectual Graveyard
Place of birth missing
Year of birth missing
Academic staff of Notre Dame College, Dhaka